Hugh Steven James Mingay (born 12 December 1974), also known by his stage name Skoll, is a heavy metal musician.

Musical career 
He became a member of the Norwegian band Arcturus from 1995 to 2000 for the recording of the album Aspera Hiems Symfonia, but he left the band just before The Sham Mirrors was released and was credited as a session member.

Skoll came back to the band in 2002 and remained there until the band broke up in 2007. Hugh has also been the bassist for the Norwegian band Ulver between 1994 and 1998 and was formerly a member of the band Ved Buens Ende, under his pseudonym Skoll.

Discography

With Arcturus 
Aspera Hiems Symfonia (Studio Album, 1996)
La Masquerade Infernale (Studio Album, 1997)
The Sham Mirrors (Studio Album, 2002)
Aspera Hiems Symfonia/Constellation/My Angel (Compilation, 2002)
Sideshow Symphonies (Studio Album, 2005)
Shipwrecked in Oslo (Live Album, 2005)
 Arcturian - (Studio Album, 2015)

With Ulver 
Bergtatt – Et eeventyr i 5 capitler (Studio Album, 1994)
Nattens madrigal (Studio Album, 1996)*
The Trilogie – Three Journeyes Through the Norwegian Netherworlde (Compilation, 1997)
Themes from William Blake's The Marriage of Heaven and Hell (Studio Album, 1998)

With  Ved Buens Ende 
Written in Waters (Studio Album, 1995)
Those Who Caress the Pale (EP, 1997)

With Fimbulwinter 
Servants of Sorcery (Studio Album, 1994)

External links 
 Hugh Stephen James Mingay at Discogs
Metalum Archives

Norwegian heavy metal bass guitarists
Norwegian male bass guitarists
Norwegian rock bass guitarists
1974 births
Living people
Ulver members
Arcturus (band) members
21st-century Norwegian bass guitarists
21st-century Norwegian male musicians